The swimming competition at the 1993 South Asian Federation Games  in Dhaka, Bangladesh.

Result

Men's events

References

Swimming at the South Asian Games
1993 South Asian Games
1993 in swimming